Different Damage is a Q and Not U album that was recorded at Inner Ear Studios in May/June 2002 and released in October 2002 on Dischord Records. It was engineered and produced by Ian MacKaye and Don Zientara and mastered by Chad Clark at Silver Sonya. The front cover and insert photography was taken by Shawn Brackbill in the accident inspection bay at the Geico headquarters in NW Washington, D.C.  The back cover was shot by Brackbill at the Tidal Basin in Washington, D.C.  Different Damage was the band's first full-length album as a trio, following the dismissal of bassist Matt Borlik in November 2001.

Track listing
 "Soft Pyramids" – 4:07
 "So Many Animal Calls" – 2:08
 "Air Conditions" – 4:00
 "Black Plastic Bag" – 2:17
 "Meet Me in the Pocket" – 4:31
 "This Are Flashes" – 3:10
 "Everybody Ruins" – 1:54
 "Snow Patterns" – 3:01
 "When the Lines Go Down" – 2:27
 "O'No" – 1:16
 "No Damage Nocturne" – 3:30
 "Recreation Myth" – 3:53

Personnel 

 John Davis – drums, percussion, vocals
 Harris Klahr – guitar, vocals, synths
 Christopher Richards – guitar, vocals, synths
 Shawn Brackbill – photography
 Chad Clark – mastering
 Ian MacKaye – producer, engineer
 Jeff Nelson – assembly
 Q and Not U – design, assembly
 Don Zientara – producer, engineer

Q and Not U albums
Dischord Records albums
2002 albums